Chernoberyozovka is a rural locality (a selo) in Arkadyevsky Selsoviet of Arkharinsky District, Amur Oblast, Russia. The population was 69 as of 2018. There are 3 streets.

Geography 
Chernoberyozovka is located on the right bank of the Arkhara River, 14 km east of Arkhara (the district's administrative centre) by road. Arkadyevka is the nearest rural locality.

References 

Rural localities in Arkharinsky District